Norman Craven Brook, 1st Baron Normanbrook,  (29 April 1902 – 15 June 1967), known as Sir Norman Brook between 1946 and 1964, was a British civil servant. He was Cabinet Secretary between 1947 and 1962 as well as joint permanent secretary to HM Treasury and head of the Home Civil Service from 1956 to 1962.

Background and education
Brook was born at 18, Cricklade Road, Bristol, the son of Frederick Charles Brook (1867–1937) and Annie (d. 1921), daughter of Thomas Smith, of Bradford, West Yorkshire. Frederick Brook was at different times a schoolmaster, inspector of schools, tax assessor, and district inspector for the Ministry of Health. He was the son of George Brook, of Bradford, a cabinet-maker. Harold Macmillan (although himself of recent undistinguished crofting ancestry, notwithstanding his grandfather Daniel MacMillan's success in founding Macmillan Publishers) was fascinated by the fact that, despite Brook, his Cabinet Secretary, having "no background" and being of comparatively humble origins, he possessed "remarkably sound judgement". Brook was educated at Wolverhampton Grammar School and Wadham College, Oxford. Maurice Bowra, who taught Brook at Oxford, remarked when considering his progression to the heart of the establishment that Brook was "very quick... Came up with a front pocket stuffed full of pens. Soon disappeared inside. Learned the tricks."

Career
Brook joined the Home Civil Service in 1925 and attained the grade of Principal in 1933 and of Assistant Secretary in 1938. He was Principal Private Secretary to Sir John Anderson from 1938 to 1942, Deputy Secretary (Civil) to the War Cabinet in 1942, Permanent Secretary at the Ministry of Reconstruction from 1943 to 1945, Additional Secretary to the Cabinet from 1945 to 1946, and Secretary of the Cabinet from 1947 to 1962. He was also joint permanent secretary to HM Treasury and head of the Home Civil Service from 1956 to 1962. Brook was appointed a Companion of the Order of the Bath (CB) in 1942, promoted to Knight Commander (KCB) in 1946 and Knight Grand Cross (GCB) in 1951, and sworn of the Privy Council in 1953.

Churchill and Brook were colleagues during the Second World War and Churchill's 1951-1955 government. Brook was his adviser. Brook was a member of The Other Club. Brook succeeded Sir Edward Bridges as a secretary to the treasury in 1956. He served there to 1962.

On 24 January 1963 he was raised to the peerage as Baron Normanbrook, of Chelsea in the County of London. Between 1964 and 1967 he was Chairman of the Board of Governors of the BBC. He was one of the twelve pall bearers at Sir Winston Churchill's funeral in 1965.

Personal life
Lord Normanbrook married Ida Mary, daughter of E. A. Goshawk, in 1929. He died in June 1967, aged 65, when the barony became extinct.

See also
 List of residents of Wolverhampton
The Papers of Lord Normanbrook held at Churchill Archives Centre

References

External links 
 Bridges, Edward Ettingdene; The Other Club.
 Colville, John. 1981. The Churchillians.London:Weidenfeld and Nicolson.
 Gilbert Martin. 1983–1988. Winston S.Churchill.Vol.6-8.London:Heinemann.
 Seldon Abthony.1981.Churchill's Indian Summer. London:Hodder and Stoughton.
 Trend, Lord.1981."Brook, Norman Craven, Baron Normanbrook". In the Dictionary of National Biography 1961–1970, edited by E.T.Williams andC.S.Nicholls. Oxford:Oxford University Press.
 
 
 
 

1902 births
1967 deaths
People educated at Wolverhampton Grammar School
Alumni of Wadham College, Oxford
Chairmen of the BBC
Knights Grand Cross of the Order of the Bath
BBC Governors
Brook, Norman
Brook, Norman
Members of the Privy Council of the United Kingdom
Brook, Norman
Hereditary barons created by Elizabeth II